Domitian's Dacian War was a conflict between the Roman Empire and the Dacian Kingdom, which had invaded the province of Moesia. The war occurred during the reign of the Roman emperor Domitian, in the years 86–88 AD.

Dacian attack and defeat of Oppius Sabinus

At the end of 85 or the beginning of 86 AD, the Dacian king Duras ordered his troops to attack the Roman province of Moesia on the southern course of the Danube river. The Dacian army was led by Diurpaneus, often cited as one and the same with the later king named Decebalus, although these assumptions remain obscurely founded and problematic. It seems that the Romans were caught by surprise since the governor, Oppius Sabinus, and his forces, possibly including the Legio V Alaudae, were annihilated.

Following this attack, Domitian, accompanied by Cornelius Fuscus, Prefect of the Praetorian Guard, personally arrived in Moesia, reorganized the province into Moesia Inferior and Moesia Superior, and planned a future attack into Dacia. To replenish their forces and greatly strengthen the Roman army in this territory, the Legio IV Flavia Felix from Dalmatia and two more legions, the I and II Adiutrix, were moved to Moesia from the western provinces. The region of Sirmium was attached to Moesia Superior, in order to have a single command over the endangered Dacian frontier.

Historians are divided as to what happened next. A. Mócsy suggests that after handing over the command to Fuscus, Domitian returned to Rome in the same year, while Fuscus cleared the Dacian invaders from the province. According to E. T. Salmon and M. Bunson, however, Domitian personally led the successful operations, then returned to Rome to celebrate a double triumph.

Defeat of Cornelius Fuscus

In the same year (86), after the initial success against the Dacians, Cornelius Fuscus crossed the Danube. However, his army was ambushed by Decebalus and attacked on all sides. Although Fuscus attempted to rally his men, the attempts proved unsuccessful and Fuscus himself died in the battle. The battle standard of the Praetorian Guard was also lost, and although the Praetorian cohorts would be restored, the Legio V Alaude were permanently destroyed.

Grumeaza has speculated that, after this victory, Diurpaneus received the name of Decebalus, a term he translated as meaning "as strong as ten wild men".

Peace
After the battle, the course of events is unclear and a satisfactory chronological reconstruction is not possible. Suetonius mentions that there were "several battles of varying success" (against the Dacians). Lucius Antonius Saturninus, commander of the Roman army in Germania Superior, revolted. In addition, the Iazyges, Marcomanni, and Quadi refused to provide troops to Domitian for his Dacian war. Domitian killed their peace emissaries and attacked them, then he left for the Rhine frontier. He was forced to return to Pannonia after the Romans had suffered a defeat there. All these problems halted the Roman offensive and Decebalus, now the Dacian king, sued for peace, sending his brother, Diegis, as his plenary representative. Under the terms of the treaty, Decebalus returned the Roman prisoners of war but he was also lent a number of Roman engineers who helped him in building defensive fortifications. The Romans would pay an annual subsidy of 8 million sesterces and Decebalus was recognized as a client king of Rome.

Aftermath
For the remainder of Domitian's reign Dacia remained a relatively peaceful client kingdom, but Decebalus used the Roman money to fortify his defences. Domitian probably wanted a new war against the Dacians, and reinforced Upper Moesia with two more cavalry units brought from Syria and with at least five cohorts brought from Pannonia. Trajan continued Domitian's policy and added two more units to the auxiliary forces of Upper Moesia, using the buildup of troops for his Dacian wars.

See also 
Dacian warfare

Notes

References
Bunson, Matthew (1994), Encyclopedia Of The Roman Empire, Infobase Publishing, 2002
Bury, J. B. (1893), A History of the Roman Empire from its Foundation
Grumeza, Ion (2009), Dacia: Land Of Transylvania, Cornerstone Of Ancient Eastern Europe, University Press of America, 2009
 Jones, Brian W. (1992), The Emperor Domitian, Routledge.
Mócsy, András (1974) Pannonia and Upper Moesia, Routledge, 1974
Salmon, E. T. (1944), A History of the Roman World from 30 B.C. to A.D. 138, Routledge, 1990

Bibliography 

 
 
 
 

Tapae 87
Flavian military campaigns
Wars involving Dacia
1st century
86
87
88
80s in the Roman Empire
Domitian
80s conflicts